Dmitri Anatolyevich Kudinov (born 17 March 1971) is a former Russian football player.

References

1971 births
Living people
Soviet footballers
FC Akhmat Grozny players
FC Tom Tomsk players
Russian footballers
FC Dynamo Stavropol players
Russian Premier League players
Qarabağ FK players
Russian expatriate footballers
Expatriate footballers in Azerbaijan
Place of birth missing (living people)
FC Armavir players
Association football midfielders
Association football forwards